Selenodes karelica is a moth belonging to the family Tortricidae.

The species was described in 1875 by Johan Martin Jakob von Tengström as Penthina karelica.

It is native to Europe.

References

Tortricinae